Deh Gin (also Romanized as Deh Gīn) is a village in Mosaferabad Rural District, Rudkhaneh District, Rudan County, Hormozgan Province, Iran. At the 2006 census, its population was 107, in 24 families.

References 

Populated places in Rudan County